The Taitung County Government is the local government of  Taitung County, Taiwan.

Organizations
 Civil Service Ethics Office
 Personnel Office
 Accounting and Statistics Office
 Planning Office
 General Affairs Office
 Indigenous People's Bureau
 Urban and Rural Development Bureau
 Cultural Affairs Bureau
 Tourism Bureau
 Land Administration Bureau
 Social Affairs Bureau
 Agriculture Bureau
 Education Bureau
 Public Works Bureau
 Finance Bureau
 Civil Affairs Bureau

See also
 Taitung County Council

References

External links

 

Taitung County
Local governments of the Republic of China